The most common type of spring is the coil spring, which is made out of a long piece of metal that is wound around itself. 
Coil springs were in use in Roman times, evidence of this can be found in bronze Fibulae — the clasps worn by Roman soldiers among others. These are quite commonly found in Roman archeological digs.

Coil springs can be either compression springs, tension springs or torsion springs, depending on how they are wound.

A coil spring is a mechanical device which is typically used to store energy and subsequently release it, to absorb shock, or to maintain a force between contacting surfaces.  They are made of an elastic material formed into the shape of a helix which returns to its natural length when unloaded.

They are commonly used in mattresses, automotive suspensions, and residential plumbing. Coil springs come in a variety of sizes and shapes and can be used for a variety of applications. Small coil springs are often used in electronic devices, while larger ones are used in automobile suspensions. Coil springs can be made from various materials, including steel, brass, and bronze.

Spring rate 

Spring rate is the measurement of how much a coil spring can hold until it compresses . The manufacture normally specifies the spring rate.

Types

Types of coil spring are:

 Tension/extension coil springs, designed to resist stretching.  They usually have a hook or eye form at each end for attachment.
 Compression coil springs, designed to resist being compressed.  A typical use for compression coil springs is in car suspension systems.
 Volute springs are used as heavy load compression springs. A strip of plate is rolled into the shape of both a helix and a spiral. When compressed, the strip is stiffer edge-on than a wire coil, but the spiral arrangement allows the turns to overlap rather than bottoming out on each other.
Arc springs (bow springs) are a special form of coil spring which was originally developed for use in the dual-mass flywheel of internal combustion engine drive trains. The force is applied through the ends of the spring. A torque  can be transmitted around an axis via the force  directed along this helical axis and the lever arm to the system center point .
 Torsion springs, designed to resist twisting actions. Often associated to clothe pegs or up-and-over garage doors.

Heavy-duty springs 
Heavy-duty springs are designed to withstand high levels of force and tension. They are typically used in industrial and commercial applications where heavy loads need to be supported or generated. Heavy-duty springs can be made from various materials, including steel, stainless steel, and titanium. They are typically much stiffer and thicker than standard springs (3 mm — 65 mm thick) and can have a wide range of sizes and shapes. Because of their strength and durability, heavy-duty springs are typically used in automotive and mining applications. They are also commonly used in construction, motorsport, rail and other industries where heavy equipment is used.

Design 
Spring design must take into account the desired stiffness of the spring, as well as the amount of space that is available for the spring. In addition, springs must be designed to withstand the forces that will be applied to them, such as the car's weight or the gas pressure. Spring design is an important part of many engineering applications, and it is crucial to ensure that products work correctly and safely.

Applications 
Coil springs have many applications; notable ones include:

 Buckling springs in computer keyboards
 Mattress coils in innerspring mattresses
 Upholstery coil springs in upholstery

Coil springs are commonly used in vehicle suspension. These springs are compression springs and can differ greatly in strength and in size depending on application. A coil spring suspension can be stiff to soft depending on the vehicle it is used on. Coil spring can be either mounted with a shock absorber or mounted separately. Coil springs in trucks allow them to ride smoothly when unloaded, and once loaded the spring compresses and becomes stiff. This allows the vehicle to bounce less when loaded. Coil spring suspension is also used in high performance cars so that the car can absorb bumps and have low body roll. In off-road vehicles, they are used because of their range of travel they allow at the wheel.

Coil springs used in the engine are compression springs and play an important role in closing the valves that feed air and let exhaust gases out of the combustion chamber. The spring is attached to a rocker that is connected to the valve.

Tension and extension coil springs of a given material, wire diameter and coil diameter exert the same force when fully loaded; increased number of coils merely (linearly) increases free length and compressed/extended length.

Manufacture 
Metal coil springs are made by winding a wire around a shaped former a cylinder is used to form cylindrical coil springs.

Spring manufacture is the process of making springs by coiling, winding, or forming steel wire or other materials. Spring manufacturing includes various processes, including cold coiling and hot coiling. 

To meet the demands of today's consumers, spring manufacturers must be able to produce springs in a wide range of sizes and shapes. As a result, spring manufacture has become increasingly complex and specialized. They must have a thorough understanding of spring design to produce quality products. In addition, they must be able to operate various machines to produce springs with the desired characteristics. Spring manufacture is a critical part of the economy, and spring makers play an important role in ensuring that products meet the highest quality standards.

Coil springs for vehicles are typically made of hardened steel. A machine called an auto-coiler takes spring wire that has been heated, so it can easily be shaped. It is then fed onto a lathe that has a metal rod with the desired coil spring size. The machine takes the wire and guides it onto the spinning rod, as well as pushing it across the rod to form multiple coils. The spring is then ejected from the machine and an operator will put it in oil to cool off. The spring is then tempered to lose the brittleness from being cooled. The coil size and strength can be controlled by the lathe rod size and material used. Different alloys are used to get certain characteristics out of the spring, such as stiffness, dampening, and strength.

See also 

 Bogie
 Leaf spring
 Shock absorber
 Slinky
 Timmis system

References

External links 

 Helical Spring by Sándor Kabai at The Wolfram Demonstrations Project.
 Institute of Spring Technology
 Cold Coiling Vs Hot Coiling blog article by Lesjöfors Heavy Springs
 Spring Manufacturers Institute 
 , tutorial by Dave Silberstein.
  "You Spring From Morning To Night" , April 1949, Popular Science article on the basics of steel coil springs manufacturing.
 'Springs' information on each type of spring by Lesjöfors Heavy Springs

Coil spring
Coil spring

de:Feder (Technik)#Schraubenfeder